Main Market, Onitsha  is one of the largest markets in West Africa based on geographical size and volume of goods. It is based in the city of Onitsha, in Onitsha North Local Government Area, the commercial capital of Anambra State in southeastern Nigeria. The town is located on the east bank of the Niger River that joined the Anambra River. The building that made up the main market Onitsha was regarded as the largest in Nigeria. That building was destroyed during the Nigeria civil war in 1968 but was rebuilt after the war.

The market is governed by one of the most revered traders associations on the continent, the Onitsha Market Traders Association (OMATA). Most of the major import merchants from Eastern Nigeria have their head offices within the market. The average traders in the area are known to bring in at least six consignments of 40 tonnes (40-feet containers) of goods annually. Some of the major importers do more than 200 consignments of 40 tonnes of goods per year. These include jewelry, clothing, household, industrial, and office equipment.

It is bounded by the River Niger to the West and Fegge through Osumaru Road from the East. The market is secured by the Onitsha Main Market Vigilante Services working under the auspices of the Nigeria Police Force. The market can rightfully be described as the commercial powerhouse of West Africa. It is massively patronized by merchants in the ECOWAS sub-region including Accra, Abidjan, Douala, Niamey ,  Cotonou , and elsewhere on the continent, to mention a few.

A wide variety is on offer in Onitsha's main market. Despite good security, many pick-pockets and swindlers are active.

Onitsha Market Literature came from here.

Brief History of Main Market Onitsha 
It was not very clear when Onitsha main market started but the economic activities therein dated back to around the sixteen century (1506). That was when the people of Onitsha settled near the bank of the River Niger. Initially, the Onitsha main market was called the Otu-nkwor Eze. This was because it opened for business activities on Nkwor market days, that is, every four days as the Igbo calendar mapped it. However, as people settled in Onitsha and the population grew, it became a daily market with trade by barter and cowries as a medium of exchange. The coming of the Portuguese made the market grow as they brought their beautiful clothing, guns, gunpowder and other valuables in exchange with palm produce, slaves, whom they took to their industries and farms in Europe and South America.

Markets that Grew out of Main Market Onitsha 
Main market Onitsha grew so big that many other big markets were created to accommodate other sales of wares and the traders. Some of these markets were:

Ogbo ogwu (pharmaceutical)

Ochanja Market (food stuff and articles)

Relieve Market

Ogbo efere (ceramics, plates and cooking ware)

Ogbo abada (Textiles)

Electrical market

Ogbo okporoko (Stock fish)

Ogbo-Oshishi (timber market)

Motor spare parts

Building Material market

Glass market

Sit-at-Home Order and Main Market Onitsha 

The sit-at-home order by Independent People of Biafra (IPOB) in the South-East region is also enforced in the Onitsha Main market. Thus, the shops are locked up every Monday with no business activity going on in the main market. However, the Governor of Anambra State, Governor Willie Obiano has directed through his Commissioner for Commerce, Trade and Wealth Creation, Chief Uchenna Okafor, to interact with the market leaders to start opening their businesses on Monday but fear of molestation by thugs could not allow them to do that. So traders still sit-at-home on Mondays in Onitsha.

Fire incident 
Main markets have experienced different fire incidents over the years, witnessed many fire outbreaks, hence the reason for fire service stations at various points in the city.

References

External links
 Traders disrupt prayers over alleged leadership elongation in Onitsha market

Retail markets in Anambra
Retail markets in Nigeria
Onitsha